Techkriti is an annual four-day inter-collegiate technical and entrepreneurship festival at the Indian Institute of Technology Kanpur. The festival is usually held in March. The 29th Techkriti is scheduled to be held from 23 to 26 March 2023. The festival began in 1995 to develop student technological innovation. The word Techkriti is derived from tech (technology) and the Sanskrit kriti (creation).

History

IIT Kanpur, established in 1959, is among India's premier institutes of technology. The first Techkriti was held in March 1995 and has since continued as the institute's  annual technological and entrepreneurial festival. Since then the fest has grown and is claimed to be Asia's largest technical and entrepreneurial fest.

Organisation
Techkriti is an entirely student organized festival. The structure of the organising team is four-tiered. Leading the team were the Festival Coordinators along with a team of Heads, each with an allotted portfolio. Administrative portfolios include marketing, media and publicity, finance, security, hospitality and show management. Event-related portfolios include public relations, web and design. Each Head has his own team of coordinators and executives.

Techkriti-19 came under extensive scrutiny due to financial mismanagement by the student team and the then finance head. The festival had to be bailed out using funds from the students gymkhana, collected as a part of the fee from current students. These financial malpractices led to an overhaul of the festival team, which was then overseen by a festival advisory committee chaired by a faculty counsellor.

Workshops and talks

Students and academia at the festival can attend talks by professionals in various fields from India and abroad. Speakers at Techkriti have included aerospace scientist and former Indian president A. P. J. Abdul Kalam, Free Software Foundation founder Richard Stallman and Rakesh Sharma, the only Indian to date to travel in space. Former Afghan president Hamid Karzai was the guest of honour at the 2016 festival, which was scheduled to end with a musical evening.

References

External links

Techkriti Website

Indian Institutes of Technology festivals
IIT Kanpur
Technical festivals in India
1995 establishments in Uttar Pradesh
Festivals established in 1995